Private First Class Douglas Eugene Dickey (December 24, 1946 – March 26, 1967) was a United States Marine who posthumously received the Medal of Honor for heroism during Operation Beacon Hill 1, on March 26, 1967, while serving as a rifleman with Company C, 1st Battalion, 4th Marines, 9th Marine Amphibious Brigade, 3rd Marine Division, in the Republic of Vietnam.

Biography
Douglas Dickey was born on December 24, 1946, in Greenville, Ohio. He graduated from grammar school in 1961, and from high school in 1965.

On December 13, 1965, he enlisted in the U.S. Marine Corps Reserve at Cincinnati, Ohio, and was discharged to re-enlist in the Regular Marine Corps on April 11, 1966.

In June 1966, after completing recruit training at the Marine Corps Recruit Depot San Diego, California, he was transferred to the Marine Corps Base at Camp Pendleton, California, where he underwent individual combat training with the Second Infantry Training Regiment, graduating in August 1966.

The following October, he joined Company B, 1st Battalion, 4th Marines, 3rd Marine Division, in the Republic of Vietnam. While attached to this unit, he participated in Operation Prairie. He was promoted to private first class on October 1, 1966.

On November 8, 1966, he was transferred to Company C, 1st Battalion, 4th Marines, 3rd Marine Division, and participated in combat against the Viet Cong, in Operations Deckhouse, Desoto and Beacon Hill. It was during the latter engagement that he was mortally wounded on March 26, 1967.

He is buried in Brock Cemetery, Darke County, Ohio.

Decorations

A list of his medals and decorations includes: the Medal of Honor, the Purple Heart with two Gold Stars, the National Defense Service Medal, the Vietnam Service Medal with one bronze star, and the Republic of Vietnam Campaign Medal.

Medal of Honor citation
The President of the United States in the name of The Congress takes pride in presenting the MEDAL OF HONOR posthumously to

for service as set forth in the following CITATION:
For conspicuous gallantry and intrepidity at the risk of his life above and beyond the call of duty while serving with the Second Platoon, Company C, First Battalion, Fourth Marines, Third Marine Division in the Republic of Vietnam on March 26, 1967. While participating in Operation BEACON HILL I, the Second Platoon was engaged in a fierce battle with the Viet Cong at close range in dense jungle foliage. Private First Class Dickey had come forward to replace a radio operator who had been wounded in this intense action and was being treated by a medical corpsman. Suddenly an enemy grenade landed in the midst of a group of Marines, which included the wounded radio operator who was immobilized. Fully realizing the inevitable result of his actions, Private First Class Dickey, in a final valiant act, quickly and unhesitatingly threw himself upon the deadly grenade, absorbing with his own body the full and complete force of the explosion. Private First Class Dickey's personal heroism, extraordinary valor and selfless courage saved a number of his comrades from certain injury and possible death at the cost of his own life. His actions reflected great credit upon himself, the Marine Corps and the United States Naval Service. He gallantly gave his life for his country.
/S/ LYNDON B. JOHNSON

Memorial
The portion of Ohio State Route 47 between SR 49 and US 127, near Ansonia in Darke County, is designated "Pfc. Douglas E. Dickey Memorial Highway" in his honor.

See also

List of Medal of Honor recipients
List of Medal of Honor recipients for the Vietnam War

Notes

References

1946 births
1967 deaths
United States Marine Corps Medal of Honor recipients
People from Greenville, Ohio
United States Marines
American military personnel killed in the Vietnam War
Vietnam War recipients of the Medal of Honor
Deaths by hand grenade
United States Marine Corps personnel of the Vietnam War
United States Marine Corps reservists